Ivette López (born12  July 1990) is a Mexican professional tennis player.

She reached career-high WTA rankings of 1046 singles and 498 in doubles.

ITF Circuit finals

Doubles: 8 (4–4)

References

External links
 
 

1990 births
Living people
Mexican female tennis players
20th-century Mexican women
21st-century Mexican women